Undercover Girl is a 1950 American film noir crime film directed by Joseph Pevney and starring Alexis Smith and Scott Brady. This was the second movie for Joseph Pevney as a director.

Plot
A young woman joins the police, and tries to track down the killers of her father who ran a narcotics ring.

Cast
 Alexis Smith as Christine Miller
 Scott Brady as Lt. Michael Trent
 Richard Egan as Jess Faylen
 Gladys George as Liz 
 Edmond Ryan as Doc Holmes
 Gerald Mohr as Reed Menig
 Royal Dano as Moocher
 Harry Landers as Tully
 Connie Gilchrist as Captain Parker
 Angela Clarke as Babe 
 Regis Toomey as "Butt" Miller
 Lynn Ainley as Pat Gibson
 Tris Coffin as Robbie (as Tristram Coffin)
 Lawrence Cregar as Murph
 Harold Gary as Wally
 Edwin Rand as Lew (as Ed Rand)
 Mel Archer as Collar

See also
 List of American films of 1950

References

External links
 
 
 

1950 films
Film noir
1950 crime drama films
1950s mystery films
American black-and-white films
American crime drama films
American mystery films
Films directed by Joseph Pevney
Films set in New York City
Universal Pictures films
1950s English-language films
1950s American films